

V

V